American singer–songwriter Maren Morris has won over 30 awards and has been nominated for over 90 awards. She has received five awards from the Academy of Country Music. Her first accolade from the association was for New Female Artist of the Year in 2017. She later won Female Artist of the Year two times in 2020 and 2021. Her single "The Bones" would also win Song of the Year from the association in 2021. Morris has also won five awards from the Country Music Association, beginning with New Artist of the Year in 2016. She later won Female Vocalist of the Year in 2020, while "The Bones" won Single and Song of the Year. Morris's single "My Church" won one accolade from the Grammy Awards and she has since been nominated several more times from the program. Morris also has also won and been nominated for awards by Billboard, Country Music Television and the American Music Awards.

Academy of Country Music Awards

American Music Awards

APRA Music Awards

Billboard Music Awards

BMI Awards

BMI Country Awards

BMI Pop Awards

British Country Music Association Awards

Country Music Association Awards

CMT Music Awards

Grammy Awards

iHeartRadio Music Awards

iHeartRadio Titanium Awards 
iHeartRadio Titanium Awards are awarded to an artist when their song reaches 1 Billion Spins across iHeartRadio Stations.

iHeartRadio Much Music Video Awards

MTV Video Music Awards

Radio Disney Music Awards

People's Choice Awards

Teen Choice Awards

References

Mandrell, Barbara